The Whole Truth is a 1958 British-American thriller film directed by John Guillermin and starring Stewart Granger, George Sanders, Donna Reed, Gianna Maria Canale and Peter Dyneley. It was based on the 1955 play of the same title by Philip Mackie.

It was made at Walton Studios with some brief location shooting in France. The film's sets were designed by the art director Anthony Masters.

Plot
While making a film on the French Riviera, the producer, Max Poulton, has been having an affair with his star, Gina Bertini. A married man, Max does not want to lose his wife Carol, but the hot-tempered Gina threatens to tell all.

Max comes home with a blood stain on his shirt cuff. A visit follows from an Inspector Carliss of Scotland Yard, who says Gina's body has just been found, stabbed to death.

Rushing to the house where he and Gina used to secretly meet, Max gathers up possessions he's left behind. A neighbour spots his car. Upon returning home, to a party Carol is hosting, Max is astounded to find Gina alive and well among the guests.

Confused, he drives her home, leaves her in the car briefly, then returns to find her lifeless body, once again stabbed. This time, a local police official, Inspector Simon, comes to call. The only conclusion Max can draw is that Carliss is somehow trying to frame him.

His suspicions are correct. Carliss is not a Scotland Yard inspector at all but Gina's jealous husband. He has arranged things to make Max appear guilty, and Simon, having the neighbour's eyewitness description of seeing Max's car,  has little choice but to place Max under arrest.

When it looks as though Carliss intends to harm Carol as well, Max escapes from jail. He manipulates Carliss into stealing his own car, and when the police give chase to the wrong man, Carliss, in a panic, drives off a cliff to his death. Max's innocence becomes apparent to the police.

Cast

Original TV play
Philip Mackie's 90-minute play debuted on television, airing on the BBC in July 1955. The TV play was screened again in 1956. Stephen Harrison directed.

Cast
Ellen Blueth as Deenie
Michael Brill as Hugh Carliss

Stage play
It was then turned into a stage play which was presented by Henry Sherek in London in October 1955 starring Leslie Philips.

Reviewing it Kenneth Tynan said the first two acts were "the tautest puzzle play since Dial M for Murder" but did not like the ending.

Original cast
Ernest Clark as the director
Leslie Phillips as the murderer
Sarah Lawson as the director's wife

Production

Development
The US rights and film rights were bought by Gilbert Miller in January 1956.

The film was made by Romulus Productions. Stewart Granger had just finished his contract with MGM and signed a two-picture deal with Romulus, of which The Whole Truth was to be the first; the second was to be The Night Comers from a novel by Eric Ambler and co-starring Jean Simmons. (This film was never made).

Jeanne Crain was originally announced as the female lead. However Donna Reed ended up playing it. George Sanders joined the cast in July 1957.

Shooting
Filming started in London on 16 September 1957.

Romulus later announced they offered Stewart Granger a six-picture contract worth $1.5 million, however, he made no more films for that company.

Reception
Filmink praised the "brilliant first half".

References

External links

The Whole Truth at Letterbox DVD
The Whole Truth at BFI
Review of film at Variety

1958 films
1950s crime thriller films
1950s mystery thriller films
Adultery in films
British black-and-white films
British crime thriller films
British mystery thriller films
Columbia Pictures films
Films about film directors and producers
Films based on television plays
Films directed by John Guillermin
Films set on the French Riviera
Films shot at Nettlefold Studios
1950s English-language films
1950s British films